The Wind of Heaven is a 1945 play by the British writer Emlyn Williams.

It was first performed at the King's Theatre, Glasgow before transferring to the St James's Theatre in London's West End where it ran for 264 performances between 12 April and 1 December 1945. The original London cast included Diana Wynyard, Valerie Taylor, Megs Jenkins, Emlyn Williams, Arthur Hambling, Herbert Lomas and Barbara Couper.

References

Bibliography
 Wearing, J.P. The London Stage 1940-1949: A Calendar of Productions, Performers, and Personnel.  Rowman & Littlefield,  2014.

1945 plays
West End plays
Plays by Emlyn Williams